South African National Climbing Federation (SANCF) is the governing body for sport climbing, involving lead climbing, bouldering and speed climbing in South Africa. SANCF oversees competitive climbing across the country as well as the promotion and development of the sport in artificial climbing environments. SANCF is affiliated to the world body International Federation of Sport Climbing (IFSC) with full member status, and SASCOC.

SANCF organises national competitions across various age (including under 13, under 15, under 17, under 19 and open), and gender categories in the main disciplines such as the National Boulder Series Championships and National Lead Climbing Competition in addition to sending representative teams to compete at international events. South African climbers also participate in the Montagu Rock Rally, Boven Rock Rally, and The Rory Challenge.

History
The South African National Climbing Federation (SANCF) was founded in 2010, with the aim of the promotion of sport climbing among South African youths. It is an organisation run with the help of volunteers who share their experience and talents. SANCF was affiliated to the world governing body IFSC in 2010, which made it possible for it to send a team of 16 youths, as South Africa's first competitive climbing team, to the 2011 IFSC World Youth Championships held in Imst, Austria.

See also

Sport in South Africa
Mountain Club of South Africa

References

External links
 Official website
 IFSC website

Sport climbing
Climbing organizations
Organisations based in Johannesburg
Climbing in South Africa
Sports organizations established in 2010
2010 establishments in South Africa